Racki or Rački is a surname. It may refer to:

 Antonio Rački (born 1973), Croatian cross-country skier
 Franjo Rački (1828–1894), Croatian historian and politician
 Mirko Rački (1879–1982), Croatian painter
 Natko Rački (born 1981), Croatian football player

See also
 

Croatian surnames